Thomas H. Stockton (1808–1868) served as the Chaplain of the United States House of Representatives in 1833, 1835, 1859 and 1861.  He was also the pastor of the First Methodist Church in Philadelphia and the editor of Christian World.

Stockton was born at Mount Holly, New Jersey.  His father, William S. Stockton, was the founder and editor of the Wesleyan Repository.  He joined the Methodist Protestant Church and was closely associated with their founder Thomas Dunn.  He began his career as a minister as an itinerant preacher in the Eastern Shore region of Maryland.  In 1830 he was appointed minister of two Methodist Churches in Baltimore.  He was involved in the formal organization of the Methodist Protestant Church in 1830.  In 1837 Stockton compiled a hymnbook.

He was minister at the Methodist Church in Georgetown, D.C. while he served as chaplain of the US House.  He then served from 1838 to 1847 as a minister in Philadelphia.  He next took up a position as minister in Cincinnati, Ohio.  In 1850 Stockton attempted to set up an independent, non-denomination church.  He was elected president of Miami University but declined the appointment.

Later in 1850 Stockton returned to Baltimore and the Methodist Protestants.

Stockton gave the opening prayer at the consecration of the National Cemetery at Gettyburg, the ceremony during which Abraham Lincoln later gave the Gettysburg Address.

Reverend Stockton is buried in Section 7, Lot 58 of Mount Moriah Cemetery (Philadelphia).

Works

 The Book Above All - The Holy Bible the Only Sensible, Infallible and Divine Authority on Earth (1871)

Notes

Sources
Library of Congress prints and photos section
Mount Moriah Cemetery bio of Stockton
Ancel Henry Bassett. A Concise History of the Methodist Protestant Church From its Origin. Pittsburgh: Press of Charles A Scot, 1877.

1808 births
Chaplains of the United States House of Representatives
Methodist ministers
1868 deaths
People from Mount Holly, New Jersey
Burials at Mount Moriah Cemetery (Philadelphia)
19th-century American clergy